Sheng Jiang (born March 25, 1983) is a retired Greco-Roman wrestler from China. In 2006 he won silver medals at the Asian Games and Asian Championships. He competed at the 2004, 2008 and 2012 Olympics with the best result of a bronze medal in 2008.

References

External links
 

1983 births
Living people
Chinese male sport wrestlers
Olympic wrestlers of China
Sportspeople from Hangzhou
Wrestlers at the 2004 Summer Olympics
Wrestlers at the 2008 Summer Olympics
Wrestlers at the 2012 Summer Olympics
Asian Games medalists in wrestling
Wrestlers at the 2006 Asian Games
Medalists at the 2006 Asian Games
Asian Games silver medalists for China
Asian Wrestling Championships medalists
21st-century Chinese people